Charles Edward Griffiths (26 June 1903 – 17 May 1982) was an Australian politician. Born in Jesmond, New South Wales, he attended public schools and became a railwayman with New South Wales Railways, rising to become an official in the Australian Railways Union. He was appointed to the Australian Labor Party's New South Wales Executive before his election to the Australian House of Representatives in 1949 as the member for the new seat of Shortland. He held the seat until his retirement in 1972. Griffiths' 23 years as a member of federal parliament coincided with Labor's longest stint out of office.

Griffiths died in 1982.

References

Australian Labor Party members of the Parliament of Australia
Members of the Australian House of Representatives for Shortland
Members of the Australian House of Representatives
1903 births
1982 deaths
20th-century Australian politicians